Khooni Bistar is a Hindi horror fantasy film of Bollywood directed by Talak Raj and produced by Pradip Agarwal. This film was released on 18 January 2002 under the banner of Kumar Mangalam Films.

Plot
An insane, bloodthirsty man entraps women, rapes and kills them. He repeats his crimes every night. The police try to find the man and catch him with evidences. They use the killer's girlfriend but cannot catch him. Suddenly the police discover a fact that is uncanny and horrible.

Cast
 Raza Murad
 Kishore Bhanushali
 Rajeeb Raj
 Ali Khan
 Anil Nagrath
 Jay Kalgutkar
 Mahesh Raj
 Birbal
 Bobby Khan
 Noor Khan
 Mahendra Sharma
 Anmol

References

External links
 

2002 films
2000s Hindi-language films
Indian horror films
2002 horror films
Hindi-language horror films